Armend Mehaj (born 17 July 1981) is a Kosovar Albanian–Norwegian military officer serving as the minister of defense of the Republic of Kosovo since 2021.

Born in Isniq, Kosovo, Mehaj emigrated to Norway as a child. He received his education at Bjørknes University College in Oslo. During his career with the Norwegian military, he was stationed in Kosovo as part of the NATO peacekeeping force.

References

1981 births
Living people
Defence ministers of Kosovo
Kosovan expatriates in Norway